STARD may refer to:
 Stohl Advanced Research and Development: an Austrian auto racing team
 STARD guidelines (Standards for Reporting of Diagnostic Accuracy Studies): one of the medical reporting guidelines used for studies of diagnostic accuracy